Intercalated nucleus (nucleus intercalatus) called also Staderini nucleus is a group of nerve cells in the medulla oblongata, between the dorsal nucleus of the vagus nerve (lateral to the intercalated nucleus) and the nucleus of the hypoglossal nerve (medial to intercalated nucleus), forming part of the perihypoglossal nuclear complex.

Function. Probably involved in the control of the vestibuloocular reflex and may contribute to the vertical neural integrator.

Described for the first time  in 1894 by Rutilio Staderini (1861–1942), Italian neuroanatomist

References 
John Alan Kiernan, Murray Llewellyn Barr. Barr's The Human Nervous System: An Anatomical Viewpoint. 2008

Medulla oblongata